A general election was held in the U.S. state of Wyoming on Tuesday, November 7, 1962. All of the state's executive officers—the Governor, Secretary of State, Auditor, Treasurer, and Superintendent of Public Instruction—were up for election. Republicans ran the table on the state's executive offices, defeating incumbent Governor Jack R. Gage and incumbent Superintendent Velma Linford and picking up the Secretary of State's office. Republican State Auditor Minnie A. Mitchell was re-elected and Republicans also held the Treasurer's office.

Governor

After Democratic Governor John J. Hickey appointed himself to the U.S. Senate in 1961, Secretary of State Jack R. Gage, a fellow Democrat, became acting Governor. He ran for re-election in 1962 and was opposed by Republican nominee Clifford Hansen, the President of the University of Wyoming Board of Trustees. Gage lost re-election to Hansen by a wide margin, as many other Democrats around the state did poorly.

Secretary of State
Incumbent Democratic Secretary of State Jack R. Gage, who also served as acting Governor, ran for re-election as Governor rather than seeking another term as Secretary of State, creating an open seat. State Treasurer Doc Rogers, who had previously served as Secretary of State and Governor, announced that he would run for the seat, but he died before qualifying ended. Accordingly, Thyra Thomson, the widow of late former Congressman and U.S. Senator-elect Keith Thomson, who had been seen as a likely candidate for the special U.S. Senate election, announced that she would seek the seat instead. Thomson defeated Frank Emerson, the son of former Governor Frank C. Emerson, in the Republican primary, and then overwhelmingly defeated former State Representative Frank L. Bowron in the general election to pick up the office for the Republican Party.

Democratic primary

Candidates
 Frank L. Bowron, former State Representative from Natrona County
 Robert Outsen, Deputy Secretary of State

Results

Republican primary

Candidates
 Thyra Thomson, widow of former Congressman and U.S. Senator-elect Keith Thomson 
 Frank Emerson, former State Representative, son of Governor Frank C. Emerson

Results

General election

Results

Auditor
Incumbent Republican State Auditor Minnie A. Mitchell ran for re-election to a third term. She faced a challenge from State Senator David Foote in the Republican primary, whom she defeated handily. In the general election, she was opposed by Democratic nominee John E. Purcell, the Chairman of the Natrona County Board of County Commissioners. She, like other Republicans throughout the state, won her election by a wide margin, improving on her performance from 1958.

Democratic primary

Candidates
 John E. Purcell, Chairman of the Natrona County Board of County Commissioners

Results

Republican primary

Candidates
 Minnie A. Mitchell, incumbent State Auditor
 David Foote, State Senator from Natrona County

Results

General election

Results

Treasurer
Incumbent Republican State Treasurer Doc Rogers was unable to seek a second term due to term limits, creating an open seat. However, Rogers died prior to the end of his term, and Governor Jack R. Gage allowed Deputy Treasurer Richard J. Luman to act as Treasurer rather than appointing a replacement. Luman, however, declined to seek re-election. Prior to Rogers's death, Everett T. Copenhaver, the former Secretary of State and State Auditor, announced that he would seek the office. Copenhaver faced former State Representative Bob Adams, the Democratic nominee, who had twice before been the Democratic nominee for State Auditor, in the general election. He overwhelmingly defeated Adams, enabling his return to state government.

Democratic primary

Candidates
 Bob Adams, former State Representative from Laramie County, 1958 Democratic nominee for State Auditor, 1954 Democratic nominee for State Auditor
 Willa Wales Corbitt, Mayor of Riverton

Results

Republican primary

Candidates
 Everett T. Copenhaver, former Secretary of State, former State Auditor
 C. R. "Cal" Dodge, Laramie businessman
 Jay Brown, former State Representative from Laramie County

Results

General election

Results

Superintendent of Public Instruction
Incumbent Democratic Superintendent of Public Instruction Velma Linford ran for re-election to a third term in office. She faced Cecil M. Shaw, an instructor at Casper College, who won a contested Republican primary over Assistant State Treasurer Duke DeForest, as her general election opponent. Linford significantly outpaced the rest of the statewide Democratic ticket, but it wasn't enough for her to win re-election; she fell short of a third term by just 737 votes.

Democratic primary

Candidates
 Velma Linford, incumbent Superintendent of Public Instruction

Results

Republican primary

Candidates
 Cecil M. Shaw, Casper College instructor, field coordinator for the University of Wyoming
 F. J. "Duke" DeForest, Assistant State Treasurer

Results

General election

Results

References

 
Wyoming